Waleed Hussain (Arabic:وليد حسين) (born 15 May 1992) is an Emirati footballer. He currently plays as a midfielder for Emirates on loan from Shabab Al-Ahli.

References

External links
 

Emirati footballers
1992 births
Living people
Al Ahli Club (Dubai) players
Fujairah FC players
Shabab Al-Ahli Club players
Emirates Club players
Footballers at the 2014 Asian Games
UAE Pro League players
Association football midfielders
Asian Games competitors for the United Arab Emirates